The Taipei Metro Yongning station is a station of the Bannan line located in Tucheng District, New Taipei City, Taiwan. It served as the southern terminal station before the opening of the Dingpu station in 2015.

Station layout

The two-level, underground station with an island platform and four exits. It is located at the intersection of Zhongyang Rd. and Chengtian Rd.

It will be an out-of-station transfer with the Wanda-Zhonghe-Shulin line in 2028. The station's name could be Pitang.

Public Art
Exhibits of artifacts from nearby Zhanlong Mountain and Tudigong Mountain, which were discovered close to Yongning station, are on display. The theme for the artifacts is "Time & Debris". The two main pieces are called "The Splinter of Time" and "86400". Both pieces seek to express the sensation of time, with "86400" signifying the number of seconds in a day. It was completed in March 2006 and cost NT$4,000,000.

Exits
Exit 1: Intersection of Lane 98, Zhongyang Rd. Sec. 3 and Chengtian Rd. 
Exit 2: Beside the parking lot which is located on the intersection of Zhongyang Rd. Sec. 3 and Chengtian Rd. 
Exit 3: East side of Zhongyang Rd. Sec. 3, adjacent to Lane 69
Exit 4: West side of Zhongyang Rd. Sec. 3, beside Lane 76

Around the station
Museums
 Taiwan Nougat Creativity Museum
Highways
 National Highway No. 3
  Provincial Highway 3
Parks
 Tonghua Park
Shopping Malls
 RT-Mart Tucheng Store
Temples
 Chengtianchan Temple
Schools
 Tucheng Junior High School
Banks and other companies
 Taiwan Textile Research Institute
 Hua Nan Commercial Bank, Ltd. (between this station and Tucheng station)
Industrial Parks
 Tucheng Industrial District

References

Railway stations opened in 2006
Bannan line stations